Afrogamma is an afrotropical genus of potter wasps.

References

Potter wasps